The 2016 Northern Ontario Scotties Tournament of Hearts was held January 20–24 at the McIntyre Curling Club in Timmins. The winning Krista McCarville rink represented Northern Ontario at the 2016 Scotties Tournament of Hearts in Grande Prairie, Alberta.

Teams

Standings

Scores

January 20
Draw 1
Fleury 13-2 Wiseman
McCarville 9-2 Payne

January 21
Draw 2
McCarville 9-2 Wiseman 
Fleury 10-9 Payne

Draw 3
Wiseman 12-5 Payne
McCarville 7-6 Fleury

January 22
Draw 4
McCarville 7-1 Payne 
Fleury 11-5 Wiseman

Draw 5
Fleury 9-3 Payne vs. 
McCarville 14-0 Wiseman

January 23
Draw 6
McCarville 8-6 Fleury 
Payne 9-3 Wiseman

Final
Sunday, January 23, 10:00am

References

Curling in Northern Ontario
2016 Scotties Tournament of Hearts
Ontario Scotties Tournament of Hearts
Northern Ontario Scotties Tournament of Hearts
Sport in Timmins
January 2016 sports events in Canada